Missouri Valley High School is a public, co-educational high school of Missouri Valley Community School District, and serves grades nine through twelve.  Missouri Valley High School is in Missouri Valley, Iowa.  Missouri Valley's mascot is the Big Reds, and the school uses the colors red and white. The mascot most recently used has been an arrowhead, but is recently under debate. It was established in 1976.

Academics
Missouri Valley High School has about a 15:1 student / teacher ratio. There are about 300 students enrolled in Missouri Valley High. 
Missouri Valley High's students took the Iowa Tests for Educational Development (ITED). In 2006, the 11th graders had 79% at or above proficient in reading, the state average being 88%. Other scores showed 76% proficiency in math, with a state average of 78%.  Students that score above 40% are considered proficient on this standardized test, which is used to compare Missouri Valley students to their national classmates.

In School Organizations, Clubs, Extracurricular Activities, and Athletics

Organizations
Key Club International (Nebraska-Iowa District)
HOSA
DREAM

Missouri Valley High School Clubs
Pep Club
Math Club
Thespians
Art Club
Science Club
Spanish Club
FCCLA

Extracurricular Activities
Band
Choir
Drama
Speech

Athletics
The Big Reds compete in the Western Iowa Conference. Missouri Valley High offers many athletics a student can be involved in. Some include Cheerleading, Dance Team, volleyball, American football, girls and boys cross country, girls and boys basketball, wrestling, girls and boys track & field, soccer, girls and boys golf, baseball, and softball .
1987 Girls' Cross Country Class 2A/1A State Champions
2021 Cross Country WIC Champion

Fight song 
Missouri Valley High's fight song is the same as the Northwestern fight song, Go U Northwestern, with some minor changes.

Go ye Mo. Valley, fight for victory,
With our banners waving, we will cheer you one, two, three
fight fight fight
Go ye Mo. Valley, fight for victory
fight for the fame of our great name,
Go Mo. Valley, win this game.
Go you Big Reds! Fight fight fight!

See also
List of high schools in Iowa

Notes

Public high schools in Iowa
Schools in Harrison County, Iowa
1976 establishments in Iowa